Svatý Jiří is a municipality and village in Ústí nad Orlicí District in the Pardubice Region of the Czech Republic. It has about 300 inhabitants.

Administrative parts
Villages of Loučky and Sítiny are administrative parts of Svatý Jiří.

Etymology
The name means Saint George. The arms is canting, showing the red St George's Cross.

References

Villages in Ústí nad Orlicí District